Desan can refer to:

Desan (bishop), a Christian bishop in Mesopotamia in the 4th century AD
Deçan, a town in western Kosovo

People with the surname
Christine A. Desan, American legal scholar
Philippe Desan, Montaigne scholar and professor of French and history 
Suzanne Desan, American historian
Wilfrid Desan, a philosopher specializing in existentialism and phenomenology